The CAHDİ Party is a liberal party in Somalia.

References 

Political parties in Somalia
Liberal International
Liberal parties in Somalia